Central Asian and Southern Caucasus Film Festivals Confederation was founded in 2006.

Presidents
Gulnara Abikeyeva (2006-)

Member states
Afghanistan
Armenia
Iran
Kazakhstan
Kyrgyzstan
Tajikistan

Goals

 Mutual assistance given to festivals organized in member countries.
 Member nations will establish offices to aid in film production.

Notes

See also
Didor International Film Festival
Fajr International Film Festival

External links
Didor International Film Festival

Film organizations